The Ministry of State for Forest and Environment, is a government ministry of Telangana. It is headed by the Principal Chief Conservator of Forests. The primary function of this department is protection, conservation and management of forests in Telangana State.

Management
The Forest Department is organised in an administrative hierarchy ranging from Principal Chief Conservator of Forests to Forest Watchers, Mahouts and others.

Principal Chief Conservator of Forests
The Principal Chief Conservator of Forests is in charge of Forest Department, who must personally review, approve, and sign all significant orders, permissions, declarations and authorisations.

Protected areas
Telangana has a network of eleven sanctuaries and three national parks in the state.

Wildlife sanctuaries

National parks

The state has three national parks.

Zoological park

Kakatiya Zoological Park, Hunter Road, Warangal

References

State agencies of Telangana
Government of Telangana
Wildlife conservation in India
Telangana
2014 establishments in Telangana